Susana Cristina Saíde da Costa (born 22 September 1984) is a Portuguese athlete specialising in the triple jump. She finished eighth at the 2014 European Championships in Zürich. In addition, she won the gold medal at the 2012 Ibero-American Championships and the silver at the 2006 Lusophony Games.

Her personal bests in the event are 14.35 metres outdoors (London 2017) and 14.43 metres indoors (Glasgow 2019). At club level she represents S.L. Benfica.

Competition record

References

External links
Profile at Olympic Committee of Portugal 

1984 births
Living people
Sportspeople from Setúbal
Portuguese female triple jumpers
Black Portuguese sportspeople
World Athletics Championships athletes for Portugal
S.L. Benfica athletes
Athletes (track and field) at the 2016 Summer Olympics
Olympic athletes of Portugal
Athletes (track and field) at the 2018 Mediterranean Games
Mediterranean Games competitors for Portugal

Portuguese people of African descent